Charles Evelyn Pierrepont, Viscount Newark MP (2 September 1805 – 23 August 1850) was a Member of Parliament for East Retford, and poet.

Family
He was born on 2 September 1805 at Holme Pierrepont Hall, the son of Charles Pierrepont, 2nd Earl Manvers, and Mary Letitia Eyre. On the ascent of his father to Earl Manvers in 1816 he was styled as Viscount Newark until his death in 1850. He was married on 16 August 1832 to Hon. Emily Littleton, daughter of Edward Littleton, 1st Baron Hatherton and Hyacinthe Mary Wellesley. He died aged 44 on 23 August 1850 in Torquay, Devon.

Career
He was educated at Christ Church, Oxford and matriculated on 21 October 1823. He was awarded BA in 1826.

He was a Whig Member of Parliament for East Retford from 1830 to 1835.

Shortly before his death in 1850 he published a set of verses written between 1840 and 1848.

References

1805 births
1850 deaths
Politicians from Nottingham
Whig (British political party) MPs for English constituencies
Alumni of Christ Church, Oxford
Members of the Parliament of the United Kingdom for English constituencies
Newark
Heirs apparent who never acceded
UK MPs 1830–1831
UK MPs 1831–1832
UK MPs 1832–1835
English male poets
19th-century English poets
19th-century English male writers